A list of American films released in 1988.
Rain Man won the Academy Award for Best Picture.

A

B-C

D-G

H-K

L-M

N-Q

R-S

T-Z

See also
 1988 in American television
 1988 in the United States

References

External links

 
 List of 1988 box office number-one films in the United States

1988
Films
Lists of 1988 films by country or language